Silvino Simões Santos Silva (1886, Cernache do Bonjardim, Portugal –  14 May 1970, Manaus, Brazil) was a Portuguese-born cinematographer and photographer who emigrated and worked in Brazil. He is known for his role as director of the 1922 film No País das Amazonas, which was one of the earliest documentary films that depicted the Amazon rainforest. In addition to directing various other films about Brazil, Santos documented an expedition with the explorers Theodor Koch-Grunberg and Alexander H. Rice Jr. which was released as the 1924 film No Rastro do Eldorado.

Biography 
Born in Portugal, Santos left for Brazil early in his life. He practiced photography and was supported by the entrepreneur Julio César Arana, who was involved in the Amazon rubber industry. Arana sponsored Santos' trip to Paris in the early 1910s, where he experimented with cinematography through the Lumiere Brothers' inventions. Upon returning to Brazil with cinema film supplies, Santos created a film documenting Arana's rubber plantations along the Putomayo River. Santos settled in Manaus and around 1918 became involved in Amazônia Cine Film, a production company in the region.

His 1922 film No País das Amazonas was met with acclaim and shown in Rio de Janeiro at the Palais Cinema and in Paris. Santos continued to create documentary films about life and culture in Brazil. These included a film about the 1922–1923 Independence Centenary International Exposition and another about life in Rio de Janeiro, the capital of the country at the time. He worked for Joaquim Gonçalves de Araújo, a Brazilian film producer, for the remainder of his life. Santos married Anna Maria Schermuly and had two children. His last feature-length documentary was created in 1957, but Santos continued to make short films until the end of his life in 1970.

Filmography 
 Rio Putumayo, 1914
 No País das Amazonas, 1922
 Terra Encantada, 1923
 No Rastro do Eldorado, 1924
 Sernache de Bonjardim, 1927
 Parada Militar de 11 de Novembro de 1927, 1927
 Amendoeiras em Flor, 1929
 Terra Portuguesa, o Minho, 1934
 Santa Maria da Villa Amazónia, 1957

Further reading 
 Alencar, Miriam. "Silvino Santos no Rastro das Amazonas". Jornal do Brasil. August 8, 1970.
 Araujo, Gabriel. "Um século após registrar Amazônia, cineasta Silvino Santos volta a ser tema na Academia". AUN - Agência Universitária de Notícias, 2019.
 Souza, Márcio. "Silvino Santos: o cineasta do ciclo da borracha." Rio de Janeiro: Ministerio da Cultura, 1999.
 Stevens, Albert W. "Exploring the Valley of the Amazon in a Hydroplane." The National Geographic Magazine, no. 4, 1926.

References

External links 
 

1886 births
1970 deaths
Brazilian cinematographers
Portuguese emigrants to Brazil